New York's 137th State Assembly district is one of the 150 districts in the New York State Assembly. It has been represented by Demond Meeks since 2020, succeeding David Gantt.

Geography
District 148 is in Monroe County. It contains most of the city of Rochester and the town of Gates, west of the city.

Recent election results

2022

2020

2018

2016

2014

2012

References

137
Monroe County, New York